Downward Dog is an American sitcom that was broadcast on ABC. The series premiered on May 17, 2017, before starting its Tuesday run on May 23, 2017. On June 24, 2017, ABC canceled the series after one season of eight episodes, with the final episode airing on June 27, 2017.

Synopsis
The series follows the adventures of Martin, a philosophizing dog who sees his owner, Nan, as a beloved life partner. Martin can become vindictive and unfaithful, however, when he feels Nan is not paying enough attention to him.  Nan is a millennial who has less time for her dog than she once did because of her increasing workload at Clark and Bow Outfitters.

Cast
 Allison Tolman as Nan
 Ned as Martin, Nan's increasingly lonely and philosophical dog. Samm Hodges voices Martin.
 Lucas Neff as Jason, Nan's ex-boyfriend and occasional "friend with benefits"
 Barry Rothbart as Kevin, Nan's insecure boss who tries to undermine Nan and her coworkers' successes.
 Kirby Howell-Baptiste as Jenn, Nan's best friend and co-worker
 Maria Bamford as the voice of Pepper, a neighborhood cat that torments Martin

Production
In September 2015, ABC placed a pilot order for the series, which was based on a web series by Animal Media Group. On May 12, 2016, ABC picked up the series for the 2016–17 season as a mid-season replacement. Downward Dog was filmed in Pittsburgh, Pennsylvania.

After the series' cancellation, the producers announced plans to shop it to other networks.

Episodes

Reception and legacy
The series has received mostly positive reviews. On review aggregator website Rotten Tomatoes the series has an approval rating of 85% based on 27 reviews. The website’s consensus reads: "The adorable and insightful -- though sometimes grating -- titular pet elevates Downward Dog from its potentially "ruff" premise into a sweet, intellectual comedy". On Metacritic, the series has a score of 71 out of 100, based on 20 critics, indicating "generally favorable reviews". However, the series was canceled after the first season.

About the show's reception and legacy, Allison Tolman said: "I'm actually quite proud of it. I think it's the perfect little season, and the perfect full story. We couldn't have asked for any better, as far as the quality of the content goes. I wish that someone would stream it, so we could share it with more people 'cause I do think it was a really special show."

See also

 Downward dog, a yoga pose

References

External links
 
 

2010s American single-camera sitcoms
2017 American television series debuts
2017 American television series endings
American Broadcasting Company original programming
English-language television shows
Talking animals in fiction
Television series based on Internet-based works
Television series by ABC Studios
Television series by Legendary Television
Television shows about dogs
Television shows set in Pittsburgh
Television shows filmed in Pennsylvania
Television shows filmed in Pittsburgh